In the mathematical field of analysis, the Brezis–Lieb lemma is a basic result in measure theory. It is named for Haïm Brézis and Elliott Lieb, who discovered it in 1983. The lemma can be viewed as an improvement, in certain settings, of Fatou's lemma to an equality. As such, it has been useful for the study of many variational problems.

The lemma and its proof

Statement of the lemma
The limiting function  is automatically measurable. The Brezis–Lieb lemma asserts that if  is a positive number, then

A significant consequence, which sharpens Fatou's lemma as applied to the sequence , is that

which follows by the triangle inequality. This consequence is often taken as the statement of the lemma, although it does not have a more direct proof.

Proof
The essence of the proof is in the inequalities

The observation that

and the application of the dominated convergence theorem to the first term on the right-hand side shows that

References 

Footnotes

Sources

Measure theory